Rahul Batham (born 21 August 1998) is an Indian cricketer. He made his List A debut on 27 September 2019, for Madhya Pradesh in the 2019–20 Vijay Hazare Trophy. Prior to his List A debut, he was named in India's squad for the 2016 Under-19 Cricket World Cup. He made his Twenty20 debut on 18 November 2019, for Madhya Pradesh in the 2019–20 Syed Mushtaq Ali Trophy.

References

External links
 

1998 births
Living people
Indian cricketers
Madhya Pradesh cricketers
Place of birth missing (living people)